Porcia is a c. 1490-1495 oil on panel painting of Brutus' wife Porcia by Fra Bartolomeo, now in the Uffizi in Florence. It forms a pair with Minerva, now in the Louvre.

The painting left the Uffizi during the First World War to be stored safely elsewhere. From 1925 onwards it was displayed in the Italian Embassy in Washington, DC, Finally it was returned to Italy in 1992 to be exhibited in the Hall of Michelangelo the Florentines of the early 16th century, in the Uffizi.

Description and style
From a niche appears Porcia, recognizable by the burning coals at her feet, the daughter of Cato the Younger, because she killed herself by swallowing them, after the defeat of her husband, Marcus Junius Brutus, at the Battle of Philippi on 42 BC. The painting was meant to be part of a series dedicated to illustrious women, perhaps destined to decorate the room of a private palace.

The figure sways to the left, pointing to a probable pendant to the right. The large drapery, which falls with large and solemn folds, increases the sense of volume, as does the placement in the niche, usually reserved for statuary.

References

1490s paintings
Paintings in the collection of the Uffizi
Paintings by Fra Bartolomeo
Portraits of women